Wolong District is a District in the center part of Nanyang, in the southwest of Henan province, People's Republic of China.

Geography
Within this area, the land level is much higher in the north than in the south.

The Wolong District is part of the Yangtze River Basin.

Administrative divisions
As 2012, this district is divided to 9 subdistricts, 7 towns and 4 townships.
Subdistricts

Towns

Townships

Education

Higher education
 Nanyang Institute of Technology()
 Nanyang Normal University()
 Nanyang Medical College()
 Nanyang Vocational College of Agriculture()

Infrastructure

Transport

Railways

Highways and expressways 
China National Highway 312
G40 Shanghai–Xi'an Expressway
G55 Erenhot–Guangzhou Expressway

See also 
Expressways of Henan
China National Highways
Expressways of China
Henan
Nanyang, Henan
Wancheng District

References

External links
www.wolong.gov.cn

Nanyang, Henan
County-level divisions of Henan